This is a list of electoral divisions and wards in the ceremonial county of Oxfordshire in South East England. All changes since the re-organisation of local government following the passing of the Local Government Act 1972 are shown. The number of councillors elected for each electoral division or ward is shown in brackets.

County council

Oxfordshire
Electoral Divisions from 1 April 1974 (first election 12 April 1973) to 2 May 1985:

Electoral Divisions from 2 May 1985 to 5 May 2005:

Electoral Divisions from 5 May 2005 to 2 May 2013:

Electoral Divisions from 2 May 2013 to present:

District councils

Cherwell
Wards from 1 April 1974 (first election 7 June 1973) to 3 May 1979:

Wards from 3 May 1979 to 2 May 2002:

Wards from 2 May 2002 to 5 May 2016:

Wards from 5 May 2016 to present:

Oxford
Wards from 1 April 1974 (first election 7 June 1973) to 3 May 1979:

Wards from 3 May 1979 to 2 May 2002:

Wards from 2 May 2002 to 6 May 2021:

Wards from 6 May 2021 to present:

South Oxfordshire
Wards from 1 April 1974 (first election 7 June 1973) to 5 May 1983:

Wards from 5 May 1983 to 1 May 2003:

Wards from 1 May 2003 to 7 May 2015:

Wards from 7 May 2015 to present:

Vale of White Horse
Wards from 1 April 1974 (first election 7 June 1973) to 3 May 1979:

Wards from 3 May 1979 to 1 May 2003:

Wards from 1 May 2003 to 7 May 2015:

Wards from 7 May 2015 to present:

West Oxfordshire
Wards from 1 April 1974 (first election 7 June 1973) to 3 May 1979:

Wards from 3 May 1979 to 2 May 2002:

Wards from 2 May 2002 to present:

† minor boundary changes in 2014
‡ minor boundary changes in 2016

Electoral wards by constituency

Banbury
Adderbury, Ambrosden and Chesterton, Banbury Calthorpe, Banbury Easington, Banbury Grimsbury and Castle, Banbury Hardwick, Banbury Neithrop, Banbury Ruscote, Bicester East, Bicester North, Bicester South, Bicester Town, Bicester West,
Bloxham and Bodicote, Caversfield, Cropredy, Deddington, Fringford, Hook Norton, Launton, Sibford, The Astons and Heyfords, Wroxton.

Henley
Aston Rowant, Benson, Berinsfield, Chalgrove, Chiltern Woods, Chinnor, Crowmarsh, Forest Hill and Holton, Garsington, Goring, Great Milton, Henley North, Henley South, Kirtlington, Otmoor, Sandford, Shiplake, Sonning Common, Thame North, Thame South, Watlington, Wheatley, Woodcote.

Oxford East
Barton and Sandhills, Blackbird Leys, Carfax, Churchill, Cowley, Cowley Marsh, Headington, Headington Hill and Northway, Hinksey Park, Holywell, Iffley Fields, Littlemore, Lye Valley, Marston, Northfield Brook, Quarry and Risinghurst, Rose Hill and Iffley, St Clement's, St Mary's.

Oxford West and Abingdon
Abingdon Abbey and Barton, Abingdon Caldecott, Abingdon Dunmore, Abingdon Fitzharris, Abingdon Northcourt, Abingdon Ock Meadow, Abingdon Peachcroft, Appleton and Cumnor, Jericho and Osney, Kennington and South Hinksey, Kidlington North, Kidlington South, North, North Hinksey and Wytham, Radley, St Margaret's, Summertown, Sunningwell and Wootton, Wolvercote, Yarnton, Gosford and Water Eaton.

Wantage
Blewbury and Upton, Brightwell, Cholsey and Wallingford South, Craven,  Didcot All Saints, Didcot Ladygrove, Didcot Northbourne, Didcot Park, Drayton, Faringdon and The Coxwells, Greendown, Grove, Hagbourne, Hanneys, Harwell, Hendreds, Kingston Bagpuize with Southmoor, Longworth, Marcham and Shippon, Shrivenham, Stanford, Sutton Courtenay and Appleford, Wallingford North, Wantage Charlton, Wantage Segsbury.

Witney
Alvescot and Filkins, Ascott and Shipton, Bampton and Clanfield, Brize Norton and Shilton, Burford, Carterton North East, Carterton North West, Carterton South, Chadlington and Churchill, Charlbury and Finstock, Chipping Norton, Ducklington, Eynsham and Cassington, Freeland and Hanborough, Hailey, Minster Lovell and Leafield, Kingham, Rollright and Enstone, Milton-under-Wychwood, North Leigh, Standlake, Aston and Stanton Harcourt, Stonesfield and Tackley, The Bartons, Witney Central, Witney East, Witney North, Witney South, Witney West, Woodstock and Bladon.

See also
List of parliamentary constituencies in Oxfordshire

References

Politics of Oxfordshire
Oxfordshire